Beulah College is a coeducational Christian secondary school in Tongatapu, Tonga, established in  1938. The SDA Annual Statistics first report on Beulah College in 1941.  It lists 109 students and five teachers for only grades 1–8.  Four students graduated. The 2009 report lists 202 students, 97 of which were Seventh-day Adventists. The school provided a complete secondary school education. There were 16 graduates.

See also
List of Seventh-day Adventist secondary schools

References

Further reading

 Page 150 relates a brief account of Adventists on Tonga.

External links
Beulah College - Adventist Yearbook
 This site gives a brief, yet comprehensive, history of Tongan SDA education

Educational institutions established in 1938
Schools in Tonga
1938 establishments in Tonga
Tongatapu
Secondary schools affiliated with the Seventh-day Adventist Church